Frederick Fenton (born February 1879) was an English professional footballer who played for Gainsborough Trinity, West Ham United, and Swindon Town.

References

1879 births
Date of death missing
English footballers
Gainsborough Trinity F.C. players
West Ham United F.C. players
Swindon Town F.C. players
Southern Football League players
Association football forwards
People from Gainsborough, Lincolnshire